Notti, guai e libertà (Italian for Nights, Trouble and Freedom) is a studio album by Italian singer Patty Pravo, released in 1998 by Sony Music.

Overview
Material on the album was written by some of the most regarded Italian songwriters, such as Franco Battiato, Ivano Fossati, Francesco Guccini, and Enrico Ruggeri, as well as young artists Alex Baroni and Rosario Di Bella.

"Les Etrangers" (French for "Strangers") is a cover of "Merci bon Dieu", written by Frantz Casseus and first released by Harry Belafonte on his 1957 album An Evening with Belafonte. An instrumental version of the song, "Des Etrangers", is included as a secret recording in track 10, following the final song and a one-minute silence. Only on vinyl editions of the album are the two recordings billed separately. "Les Etrangers" was released as the lead single accompanied by a music video filmed in a mine located in Cagliari, Sardinia. The song was performed at the Festivalbar with "Strada per un'altra città" (Italian for "Road to Another City") which in turn served as the second single, followed by "Emma Bovary" later in 1998. A remix of "Angelus" was released as the fourth and final single in early 1999.

Notti, guai e libertà met with positive critical reception and is regarded one of Patty Pravo's best works. It also was a commercial success and entered the Italian charts at no. 5. The album sold 150,000 copies as of late 1998.

Track listing
"Les Etrangers" (Harry Belafonte, Frantz Casseus, Mauro Paoluzzi, Enrico Papi, Lucio Dalla) – 5:09
"Strada per un'altra città" (Bruno Bergonzi, Michele Vicino, Enrico Ruggeri) – 5:09
"Emma Bovary" (Franco Battiato, Manlio Sgalambro) – 4:53
"Angelus" (Ivano Fossati) – 5:15
"Baby blu" (Mauro Paoluzzi, Luca Madonia, Vincenzo Incenzo) – 5:25
"Sylvian" (Nicoletta Strambelli, Mauro Paoluzzi, Adelio Cogliati) – 4:10
"Per un sogno vincente" (Mario Lavezzi, Oscar Avogadro) – 4:50
"Treno di panna" (Mauro Paoluzzi, Loredana Bertè, Roberto Vecchioni) – 5:21
"Una casa nuova" (Gaetano Curreri, Francesco Guccini) – 3:54
"Sweet Love" (Paul Buchanan, Rosario Di Bella, Alex Baroni) – 10:08

Charts

References

External links
 Notti, guai e libertà – official audio on YouTube
 Notti, guai e libertà on Discogs

1998 albums
Italian-language albums
Patty Pravo albums